Victor Charles Le Fanu (14 October 1865 – 9 August 1939) was an Irish international rugby union flanker who played club rugby for Landsdowne.

Le Fanu was educated at Trinity College, Cambridge and would later play for Cambridge rugby team. He won three sporting Blues, playing in all three Varsity matches from 1884-1886.

His father was William Le Fanu, a Commissioner of the Irish Board of Works, who more famously was the brother of Sheridan Le Fanu.

International career
Le Fanu was first capped for Ireland on 6 February 1886 in a home game against England. Le Fanu, still at Cambridge, had a difficult start which saw England win comfortably, in front of a then record crowd of 7,000. Le Fanu would represent Ireland on 11 occasions, and in 1892 he captained the team in all three home nation matches.

International matches played
  1886, 1887, 1890, 1891, 1892
  1887, 1889, 1892
  1886, 1888, 1892

Bibliography

References

1865 births
1939 deaths
Alumni of Trinity College, Cambridge
Cambridge R.U.F.C. players
Ireland international rugby union players
Irish rugby union players
Lansdowne Football Club players
People educated at Haileybury and Imperial Service College
Rugby union flankers
Rugby union players from Dublin (city)